Aluva railway station (Code: AWY) is a railway station in Aluva, in the city of Kochi in the state of Kerala. It is an NSG 3 grade station under Thiruvananthapuram railway division. It lies in the Shoranur–Cochin Harbour section of Thiruvananthapuram railway division.

Aluva is an important halting stop for all passenger trains passing through the region except Rajadhani Express and a few super fast trains. This is a convenient station to alight for passengers traveling to Kalamassery, North Paravur, Idukki District, Kodungallur, Perumbavoor, Kakkanad, Kizhakkambalam, Kothamangalam and Muvattupuzha. It also serves passengers to and from Cochin International Airport. Aluva station boasts of being the third busiest railway station in Kochi city, after Ernakulam Junction railway station and Ernakulam Town railway station situated in the heart of the city. The station also handles the highest number of migrant labourers in the state since it is closest to Perumbavoor, a suburban town in Kochi Urban Agglomeration.

The station is located right aside Aluva KSRTC bus stand, one of the main bus terminals in Kochi, and a kilometre away from Aluva metro station of Kochi Metro.

Layout 
Aluva railway station has 3 platforms to handle long distance and passenger trains and 1 platform to handle cargo. There is one entrance presently a secondary entrance is being planned.

Revenue 
Aluva railway station is a high-revenue-earning station for Thiruvananthapuram railway division. In the financial year 2018–19 it earned 63,38,17,308 rupees (63.38 crores), the third highest in Kochi city, fifth highest in Kerala after Thiruvananthapuram Central in Thiruvananthapuram (184.48 crores), Ernakulam Junction railway station in Kochi (163.38 crores), Thrissur railway station in Thrissur (106.74 crores), Ernakulam Town railway station in Kochi (67.38 crores), and 19th highest in Southern Railways.

Trains passing through Aluva railway station

Passenger trains passing through Aluva railway station

Demands 

 Modernization of existing rail terminal
 Opening of new entrance at the western side
 Increasing parking facility for cars in existing terminal and in demanding new entrance at the western side
 Modification of Platform 4
 Extension of Ernakulam–Thiruvananthapuram express to Aluva
 Extension of Ernakulam-bound passenger trains (from Kollam, Kayamkulam, Kottayam and Alappuzha) to Aluva
 Extension of Kozhikode -Thrissur passenger train to aluva
 Escalators at platforms
 LED displays at the terminal
 Transfer of goods yard to Chowara
 Opening of passenger amenities centre
 Stoppage for Kochuveli–Amritsar Express
 Stoppage for Thiruvananthapuram Central–Nizamudin Express
 Stoppage for Kochuveli–Porbandhar Express
 Stoppage for Kochuveli–Dehradun Express
 Stoppage for Ernakulam–Pune Express
 Stoppage for Thiruvananthapuram Central–Chennai Superfast
 Stoppage for Thiruvananthapuram Central–Chennai Express
 Stoppage for Kochuveli–Hubli Express
 Stoppage for Thiruvananthapuram–Kannur Jan Shatabdi Express
(the stoppages for Amritsar, Dehradun, Nizamuddin and Porbandar expresses would decrease the efficiency of these services as they are the fastest trains through Kerala)

References 

Thiruvananthapuram railway division
Railway stations in Ernakulam district
Aluva